Henry Howard, 2nd Viscount Bindon (c. 1542 - 1590), aristocrat and courtier

Henry Howard was the son of Thomas Howard, 1st Viscount Howard of Bindon and Elizabeth Marney, daughter of John Marney, 2nd Baron Marney of Layer Marney and Christian Newburgh.

Howard married Frances Meautys, daughter of Peter and Jane Meautys.

Their daughter Douglas Howard married Sir Arthur Gorges in 1584. Howard had mental health problems, and was in prison at the time of his daughter's marriage.

Mark Girouard suggests that Howard started building Lulworth Castle in Dorset, which his younger brother Thomas Howard, 3rd Viscount Howard of Bindon was completing in 1607.

References

1540s births
1590 deaths
16th-century English nobility
Henry Howard, 2nd Viscount Howard of Bindon
Year of birth uncertain
Viscounts Howard of Bindon